The Pulitzer Prize for Correspondence was awarded from 1929 to 1947.

Winners
1929: Paul Scott Mowrer of the Chicago Daily News, for his coverage of international affairs including the Franco-British Naval Pact and Germany's campaign for revision of the Dawes Plan.
1930: Leland Stowe of New York Herald Tribune, For the series of articles covering conferences on reparations and the establishment of the international bank
1931: H. R. Knickerbocker of the Philadelphia Public Ledger and New York Evening Post, For a series of articles on the practical operation of the Five Year Plan in Russia.
1932: Charles G. Ross of St. Louis Post-Dispatch for his article entitled, "The Country's Plight—What Can Be Done About It?", a discussion of economic situation of the United States.
1932: Walter Duranty of The New York Times for his series of dispatches on Russia specifically the working out of the Five Year Plan.
1933: Edgar Ansel Mowrer of the Chicago Daily News for his day-by-day coverage and interpretation of the series of German political crises in 1932, beginning with the presidential election and the struggle of Adolf Hitler for public office. 
1934: Frederick T. Birchall of The New York Times for his correspondence from Europe. 
1935: Arthur Krock of The New York Times for his Washington dispatches.
1936: Wilfred C. Barber of the Chicago Tribune for his reports of the war in Ethiopia. (A posthumous award.) 
1937: Anne O'Hare McCormick of The New York Times for her dispatches and feature articles from Europe in 1936.
1938: Arthur Krock of The New York Times for his exclusive authorized interview with the President of the United States on February 27, 1937.
1939: Louis P. Lochner of Associated Press for his dispatches from Berlin.
1940: Otto D. Tolischus of The New York Times for his dispatches from Berlin.
1941: In place of an individual Pulitzer Prize for foreign correspondence, the Trustees approved the recommendation of the Advisory Board that a bronze plaque or scroll be designed and executed to recognize and symbolize the public services and the individual achievements of American news reporters in the war zones of Europe, Asia and Africa from the beginning of the present war.
1942: Carlos P. Romulo of the  Philippines Herald for his observations and forecasts of Far Eastern developments during a tour of the trouble centers from Hong Kong to Batavia. 
1943: Hanson W. Baldwin of The New York Times For his report of his wartime tour of the Southwest Pacific.
1944: Ernest Taylor Pyle of Scripps-Howard Newspaper Alliance For distinguished war correspondence during the year 1943.
1945: Harold Boyle of Associated Press for distinguished war correspondence during the year 1944
1946: Arnaldo Cortesi of The New York Times for distinguished correspondence during the year 1945, as exemplified by his reports from Buenos Aires, Argentina. 
1947: Brooks Atkinson of The New York Times for distinguished correspondence during 1946, as exemplified by his series of articles on Russia.

External links 
 https://www.pulitzer.org/prize-winners-by-category/263

Correspondence